Stanford Samuels Jr  (born July 27, 1980) is a former professional Canadian football cornerback and current recruiting coordinator for Louisville Cardinals football. He was originally signed as an undrafted free agent by the Indianapolis Colts in 2004. He played college football for Florida State.

Samuels also played for the Edmonton Eskimos, Winnipeg Blue Bombers, and Montreal Alouettes.

Professional career

Indianapolis Colts
Samuels went undrafted in the 2004 NFL Draft and signed with the Indianapolis Colts. He was cut by the Colts after training camp when they were cutting their roster down to the NFL mandated 53-man roster.

First stint with Blue Bombers
Days before the start of the Winnipeg Blue Bombers 2005 training camp he joined the team. Samuels debuted for Winnipeg in week one against the Saskatchewan Roughriders. His starting debut came in week eight against the Hamilton Tiger-Cats. He played in 17 of the 18 games, missing the last game against Calgary due to injury. He finished third on the team in tackles with 62 and then was second on the team with two fumble recoveries.

In 2006, Samuels started 12 games for Winnipeg while missing seven games including a playoff game due to injury. However, he still finished second on the team with five pass knockdowns and three interceptions. He also had 28 tackles and one tackle for a loss. The teams' only blocked punt of the season came when Samuels blocked a punt attempt of the Montreal Alouettes Damon Duval.

Edmonton Eskimos
Following the 2006 season, Samuels signed as a free agent with the Edmonton Eskimos. With Edmonton he started 14 games and was fourth one team with 51 tackles and four pass knockdowns. He also recorded one tackle for a loss and one interception.

Samuels was released by Edmonton following their 2008 training camp.

Second stint with Blue Bombers
Samuels re-signed with the Blue Bombers on July 20, 2008. He led Winnipeg in fumble recoveries and finished second on the team in interceptions. He was released on February 6, 2009.

Montreal Alouettes
Samuels signed with the Montreal Alouettes on February 24, 2009.

On July 20, 2010, Samuels was released by the Alouettes.

Coaching career
Samuels began his coaching career in 2019 at his alma mater as a defensive assistant under Willie Taggart. In 2020 he went with Taggart to Florida Atlantic and became the team’s cornerbacks coach.

Personal
Throughout his CFL career, Samuels has lashed out against management, having called former Blue Bombers general manager Brendan Taman a "snake" and then getting into a heated argument with former Eskimos head coach Danny Maciocia, following the release of Ron Warner. He was born in Miami, Florida and attended Florida State University. While there, he majored in social sciences and was a teammate of Michael Boulware and Darnell Dockett. He also has a son named Stanford Samuels III.

References

External links
Florida State Seminoles bio

1980 births
Living people
Sports coaches from Miami
African-American coaches of American football
African-American players of American football
American players of Canadian football
American football cornerbacks
Players of American football from Miami
Players of Canadian football from Miami
Canadian football defensive backs
Florida Atlantic Owls football coaches
Florida State Seminoles football coaches
Florida State Seminoles football players
Indianapolis Colts players
Edmonton Elks players
Winnipeg Blue Bombers players
Montreal Alouettes players
21st-century African-American sportspeople
20th-century African-American people